The Savannah Bananas are an exhibition baseball team based in Savannah, Georgia. The team was founded in 2016 and has played at Grayson Stadium since its inaugural season. Until 2022, the Bananas competed in the Coastal Plain League's (CPL) West division, where they won three Petitt Cup championships (2016,  2021, and 2022). The team has sold out every game since the first season in Savannah and every city on the Banana Ball World Tour. The team has been featured by ESPN, The Wall Street Journal, and Sports Illustrated because of its on-field hijinks and viral videos. The Bananas were named the league's organization of the year in both 2016 and 2017.

History
Following the departure of the South Atlantic League's Savannah Sand Gnats for Columbia, South Carolina, on September 22, 2015, the Coastal Plain League announced Savannah as its newest team to begin play for 2016. On February 25, following a name-the-team contest, the Bananas name, logo and colors were officially revealed by the team.

The 2016 Bananas ended their inaugural season as the first seed in the CPL West Division, earning home-field advantage for the first two games of the playoffs. In game one, the Bananas beat the Asheboro Copperheads, 3–2, with the first walk-off in franchise history. The Bananas then defeated the Forest City Owls, 2–0, to win the CPL West Division championship and advance to the Petitt Cup Championship. Game one of the championship was played at Grayson Stadium, where the Bananas defeated the Peninsula Pilots, 8–4. The team traveled to Hampton, Virginia, where the Pilots' 4–3 win in game two forced an all-or-nothing game three. The Bananas took home the Petitt Cup after a 9–7 win in game three.

Following the 2022 summer league season, the Bananas announced they were folding their collegiate amateur team and only playing "Banana Ball." An ESPN+ miniseries about the team, called "Bananaland," was released in August 2022.

"Banana Ball" rules 
The Bananas have implemented a number of deviations from standard baseball rules, in use since June 2020 at home and most (if not all) touring exhibition games. Branded as "Banana Ball," these include:
 The team that scores the most runs in an inning gets one point, except in the 9th inning when every run counts as one point. If an inning ends with one team at five points and a lead, that team wins.
 A two-hour time limit on games. If a team is leading on points at that time, it wins.
 No bunting. A batter who attempts a bunt is ejected from the game.
 Batters are not allowed to step out of the batters box; a violation is an automatic strike.
 Batters are allowed to "steal" first base. Specifically, they can attempt to advance to first base in the case of a wild pitch or passed ball at any time during the at-bat.
 No mound visits are allowed.
 Walks are now called sprints. After the fourth ball, the batter is allowed to advance as far around the bases as he can. The ball must be sequentially thrown to all of the fielders apart from the pitcher, starting with the catcher; the ball remains dead, with the batter-runner not liable to be put out, until all fielders apart from the pitcher and catcher have touched the ball. 
 Foul balls caught by fans are counted as outs.
 Ties are broken by what the Bananas call a "1 on 1 showdown." Each team selects a pitcher and hitter to face off, with the pitching team having only the pitcher, catcher, and a single fielder during the showdown. The hitter has to score a run in order to earn a point for the tiebreaker. A batter who draws a walk advances to second base, with the hitting team allowed to send a new batter to the plate. A showdown inning can only end with an out or a run scored.

Attendance 
The Bananas recorded over 80,000 total fans at 25 home games in 2016. The team also ranked second in average attendance (3,659 fans per game) among 160 collegiate summer teams across the country.

Due to the COVID-19 pandemic in 2020, the team reduced capacity to 30% to ensure safe distances between fans. They later reopened to full capacity after the 2021 season started.

References

External links
 Savannah Bananas
 Coastal Plain League

2016 establishments in Georgia (U.S. state)
Amateur baseball teams in Georgia (U.S. state)
Baseball teams in Savannah, Georgia
Baseball teams established in 2016
Coastal Plain League